Cryptotis aroensis is a species of mammal in the family Soricidae. It is endemic to Venezuela.

References

Cryptotis
Mammals of Venezuela
Mammals described in 2011